The Wildlife Justice Commission (WJC) is an international foundation set up in 2015, and with headquarters in The Hague, the Netherlands. The organisation operates globally with the mission to disrupt and help dismantle organised transnational criminal networks trading in wildlife, timber and fish. The WJC collects evidence with the aim of turning it into accountability. 


Investigations and scope of work
The WJC undertakes undercover, intelligence-driven investigations, based on law enforcement methodology, with a goal of presenting verifiable, first-hand evidence of wildlife crimes in case files or intelligence reports to national governments and law enforcement agencies for action. The WJC identifies high-level trafficking suspects through intelligence analysis; publishes briefings and reports to help build a broader knowledge base; and shares intelligence with governments, to enable more effective enforcement against wildlife trafficking.

The WJC’s goal is to encourage and support law enforcement action in arresting and successfully prosecuting high-level traffickers as well as disrupting their criminal networks. The organisation offers operational support but also creates diplomatic pressure on those governments that are unwilling to act on the evidence, holding a public hearing in front of recognised experts as a last resort. The WJC works with law enforcement, policymakers, intergovernmental organisations and non-governmental entities to advance the cause of wildlife justice and over the longer-term help create sustainable solutions.

Achievements
Since 2015, the WJC has conducted 24 wildlife crime investigations in 24 Asian and African countries across the supply chain, including source, transit and destination. As a result of its operations, and in co-operation with Malaysian, Indian and Vietnamese police and wildlife authorities, 70 traffickers have been arrested and 10 major trafficking networks involved in the supply of ivory, rhino horn, turtles and tortoises and tigers have been disrupted. These law enforcement efforts have led to 18 convictions, with a further 28 cases pending in court.

In 2017, as a direct outcome of WJC operations, 25 high-level traffickers were arrested, a further 88 traffickers were identified, and nine trafficking bank accounts confirmed. All WJC’s research data, some from investigations that took more than two years to complete, was delivered to governments or law enforcement authorities in India, Malaysia, Lao PDR, Viet Nam, Mozambique, China and Bangladesh.

In that year, the WJC also produced two substantial Case Files, for the governments of Viet Nam, Lao PDR and China, identifying the trafficking of over USD 30 million in ivory, rhino horn and tiger body parts such as skin, claws, teeth canines, whiskers and bones.

Partnerships and collaborations
The WJC works in partnership and develops agreements with stakeholders from different fields with the aim of achieving the biggest impact against wildlife trafficking and the criminal networks that perpetuate it.

The WJC has signed collaboration agreements with Europol, the National Whistleblower Center, and the Strathmore University of Kenya.

The organisation is also part of Plant.ID, an EU-funded project aimed at identifying ebony species used in acoustic string instruments to distinguish illegally traded from legally traded wood.

Funding
The WJC funding comes primarily from lotteries, foundation grants and individual donations.

Publications
All publications issued by the WJC are available at the organisation’s website.

References

External links
 Official website Wildlife Justice Commission

Foundations based in the Netherlands
Wildlife conservation organizations
Wildlife smuggling
2015 establishments in the Netherlands
Animal welfare organisations based in the Netherlands